Friedenweiler is a town in the district of Breisgau-Hochschwarzwald in Baden-Württemberg in southern Germany. It is 10 km north of Titisee-Neustadt.

References

Breisgau-Hochschwarzwald
Baden